Kenneth James Hush (born August 1, 1959) is an American businessman and 18th president of Emporia State University. Prior to becoming the president, Hush served as interim president from November 2021 to June 2022, and held multiple executive titles at Koch Minerals and Carbon. Hush is a former tennis player for Emporia State.

Biography

Education
Born and raised in Emporia, Kansas, Hush graduated from Emporia State University with a business administration and marketing degree in 1982, and competed on the men's tennis team where he helped lead his team to four Central States Intercollegiate Conference championships and made three National Association of Intercollegiate Athletics national tournament appearances, making him the first alumni to serve as the university president and be in the Athletics Hall of Fame. Hush later served on the Emporia State University Foundation Board of Trustees, where he served as chairman, as well as serving on the Wichita State University Board of Trustees.

Early career 
After college, Hush began his long career at Koch Industries working in the Minerals and Carbon division where he served in different leadership capacities. After leaving there, he became the general manager at Senior Commodity Company, and later returned to Emporia where he was owner and CEO of BLI Rentals.

Emporia State University 
On November 17, 2021, Hush was announced as the interim president at Emporia State. On June 22, 2022, Hush was named the 18th president of Emporia State.

References

External links 
 Office of the President

Living people
Emporia State Hornets athletes
Emporia State University alumni
Presidents of Emporia State University
People from Emporia, Kansas
Wichita State University people
1959 births
Koch Industries